Palan may refer to:
 Battle of Palan (1883)
 Ronen Palan, British academic
 Palan-e Narges, a village in Iran
 Palan-e Olya, a village in Iran
 INS Palan, a boat